Bardon Mill is a railway station on the Tyne Valley Line, which runs between  and  via . It is owned by Network Rail and managed by Northern Trains.

History
The Newcastle and Carlisle Railway was formed in 1829, and was opened in stages. The station was opened in June 1838, following the opening of the line between Greenhead and Haydon Bridge.

In 1967, the station became an unstaffed halt, along with most of the other stations on the line that escaped the Beeching Axe. The former station house and waiting room remain as a private residence.

There is an operational (though usually unmanned) signal box at Bardon Mill, which was constructed in the 1870s by the North Eastern Railway. It is Grade II listed, recognised as one of the earliest surviving NER Type N1 signal boxes.

In April 2019, the platforms at the station were extended ahead of the introduction of upgraded rolling stock, as part of the Great North Rail project.

Facilities
The station has two platforms, both of which have a ticket machine (which accepts card or contactless payment only), seating, waiting shelter, next train audio and visual displays and an emergency help point. There is step-free access to both platforms, which are linked by barrow crossing. There is a small car park and cycle storage at the station.

Bardon Mill is part of the Northern Trains penalty fare network, meaning that a valid ticket or promise to pay notice is required prior to boarding the train.

Services

As of the December 2021 timetable change, there are twelve trains per day (nine on Sunday) heading west towards Carlisle. Heading east towards Newcastle via , there are thirteen trains per day (twelve on Saturday and eight on Sunday). All services are operated by Northern Trains.

Rolling stock used: Class 156 Super Sprinter and Class 158 Express Sprinter

References

External links 
 

Railway stations in Northumberland
DfT Category F2 stations
Former North Eastern Railway (UK) stations
Railway stations in Great Britain opened in 1838
Northern franchise railway stations
1838 establishments in England